Alexander Izquierdo, better known by the stage name Eskeerdo, is a Cuban-American rapper and songwriter from Hialeah, Florida. He released his first EP, Eskeerdo, in 2015. He is known for being a member of the production team The Monsters & Strangerz.

Songwriting 
Eskeerdo's first placement as a songwriter was the song Diddy Bop for P. Diddy.

Songwriting credits

References

Living people
Rappers from Florida
Songwriters from Florida
21st-century American rappers
Year of birth missing (living people)